Efeler railway station was a railway station in İzmir, Turkey. Located in the Vali Rahmi Bey neighborhood of Buca, it was a stop on the Buca suburban. Efeler station was opened in 1995 by the Turkish State Railways and consisted of a side platform serving one track. The station was closed in 2006 along with the railway branch to Buca.

References

External links
Efeler station site in Google Street View

Railway stations opened in 1995
1995 establishments in Turkey
Railway stations closed in 2006
2006 disestablishments in Turkey
Defunct railway stations in Turkey
Buca District